Goodwin S. Gaw (born November 25, 1968) is a Hong Kong property investor, the chairman of Gaw Capital Partners, which manages US$8 billion of property investments, including the Gaw family's money, estimated at US$1.5 billion.

Early life
Gaw was born in San Francisco County, California while his father was a master's degree student in engineering at Stanford University. Gaw's father was Anthony Gaw (1941-1999), a property investor. Gaw's mother is Rosanna Wang. Gaw's younger brother Kenneth Gaw was born in Thailand. Gaw's sister is Christina Gaw.

Education
Gaw has a bachelor's degree in civil engineering from the University of Pennsylvania after transferring from Rochester Institute of Technology, a master's degree in construction management from Stanford University, and an MBA from the Wharton School, University of Pennsylvania.

Career
Gaw is the founder and Managing Principal of Downtown Properties.
In 1995, Downtown Properties, Gaw's company, bought the 335-room Hollywood Roosevelt Hotel in Los Angeles, California, out of bankruptcy.

In 2006, Gaw bought a rundown 71-year-old Art Deco seven-storey shopping mall on Nanjing Road, Shanghai for US$105 million, and intended to spend $25 million on restoration.

In 2015, the Gaw family had an estimated net worth of US$1.5 billion.

Personal life
Gaw is married, with two children, and lives in Hong Kong. Gaw renounced his United States citizenship in 2007.

References

External links
Gaw Capital Partners website

1960s births
American businesspeople
Living people
Gaw family
University of Pennsylvania School of Engineering and Applied Science alumni
Wharton School of the University of Pennsylvania alumni
Hong Kong billionaires
Stanford University alumni
American emigrants to Hong Kong
People who renounced United States citizenship